George Bright may refer to:

 George Washington Bright (1874–1949), American sailor and Medal of Honor recipient
 George Adams Bright (1837–1905), United States Navy officer and surgeon
 George Bright (priest) (died 1696), Dean of St Asaph
 George M. Bright, suspect in the 1958 Hebrew Benevolent Congregation Temple bombing
 George Bright (actor), English stage actor of the 17th century